Ernesto Noris Chacón    (born November 24, 1972) is a Cuban baseball pitcher. He played in the Serie Nacional Baseball and then defected to Brazil where he played. He represented Brazil at the 2008 Americas Baseball Cup and the 2013 World Baseball Classic.

References

External links
Baseball America
Cuba stats

1972 births
Living people
Brazilian baseball players
Brazilian people of Cuban descent
2013 World Baseball Classic players
Baseball players from Havana
Defecting Cuban baseball players